To Bed or Not to Bed (also known as The Devil) is a 1963 black-and-white Italian film directed by Gian Luigi Polidoro. It tells the story of an Italian merchant and his experiences during a visit to Sweden.

Cast
 Alberto Sordi - Amedeo Ferretti
 Gunilla Elm-Tornkvist - Corinne
 Anne-Charlotte Sjöberg - Karina
 Barbro Wastenson - Barbro
 Monica Wastenson - Monica
 Ulla Smidje - The Minister's Wife
 Ulf Palme - The Minister
 Lauritz Falk - Mr. Falkman

Awards
Wins
 Berlin Film Festival: Golden Bear
 Golden Globe Award for Best Actor – Motion Picture Musical or Comedy (Alberto Sordi)

References

External links

1963 films
Italian black-and-white films
1960s Italian-language films
Commedia all'italiana
Golden Bear winners
1963 comedy films
Films directed by Gian Luigi Polidoro
Films featuring a Best Musical or Comedy Actor Golden Globe winning performance
1960s Italian films